Kevin Joseph Kasper (born December 23, 1977) is a former American football wide receiver of the National Football League (NFL). He was drafted by the Denver Broncos in the sixth round of the 2001 NFL Draft. He played college football at Iowa.

Kasper has also been a member of the Seattle Seahawks, Arizona Cardinals, New England Patriots, Houston Texans, Minnesota Vikings, Detroit Lions and Cleveland Browns.

Early years
Kasper graduated from Hinsdale South High School in (Darien, Illinois) and Burr Ridge Middle School in (Burr Ridge, Illinois). He was a letterman in football, wrestling, and track. In football, as a senior, Kasper was named the Team M.V.P., won first-team All-Conference and first-team All-Area honors, and helped in leading his team to a 7 win-3 loss record.

College career
Kasper originally walked on at the University of Iowa but left as the school’s all-time receptions leader for a game, a season and a career. He graduated with a degree in marketing.

He finished his career with 157 catches for 1,974 yards and 11 touchdowns. As a senior, in 2000, he had 1,010 yards and 7 touchdowns receiving.

Professional career

2001 NFL Combine

He was originally selected by the Denver Broncos of the NFL in the sixth round (190th overall) in the 2001 NFL Draft out of the University of Iowa. He has also played for the Seattle Seahawks, Arizona Cardinals, Houston Texans, Detroit Lions, Minnesota Vikings, New England Patriots, and Cleveland Browns.

See also
 List of Arena Football League and National Football League players

References

External links
Iowa Hawkeyes bio 

1977 births
Living people
American football wide receivers
Iowa Hawkeyes football players
Denver Broncos players
Seattle Seahawks players
Arizona Cardinals players
New England Patriots players
Players of American football from Chicago
Houston Texans players
Minnesota Vikings players
Detroit Lions players
Chicago Rush players
Cleveland Browns players